Pascal Briand (born 9 July 1976) is a French long track speed skater who participates in international competitions.  Pascal Briand recently joined the Powerslide skate company in Germany where he is involved in the development of their speed skate products.

Personal records

Career highlights

European Allround Championships
2006 - Hamar, 24th
2008 - Kolomna, 24th

External links
 Briand at Jakub Majerski's Speedskating Database
 Briand at SkateResults.com

1976 births
French male speed skaters
Olympic speed skaters of France
Speed skaters at the 2010 Winter Olympics
Living people